Rúnar Kárason (born 24 May 1988) is an Icelandic handball player for Ribe-Esbjerg HH and the Icelandic national team.

References

1988 births
Living people
Runar Karason
Runar Karason
Handball-Bundesliga players
Expatriate handball players
Runar Karason
Rhein-Neckar Löwen players